is a railway station in the city of Ōshū, Japan, operated by East Japan Railway Company (JR East).

Lines
Rikuchū-Orii Station is served by the Tōhoku Main Line and is located 465.1 rail kilometers from the terminus of the line at Tokyo Station.

Station layout
Rikuchū-Orii Station is an unattended station that has two opposed side platforms connected to the station building by a footbridge.

Platforms

History
Rikuchū-Orii Signal stop was opened on 15 January, 1924, and elevated to a full passenger station opened on 25 November, 1928. The station was absorbed into the JR East network upon the privatization of the Japanese National Railways (JNR) on 1 April, 1987. The station building was heavily damaged by the 2011 Tōhoku earthquake and tsunami, and a new station building was completed in December 2011.

Surrounding area
Kitakami River
Maesawa High School

See also
 List of Railway Stations in Japan

External links

  

Railway stations in Iwate Prefecture
Tōhoku Main Line
Railway stations in Japan opened in 1928
Ōshū, Iwate
Stations of East Japan Railway Company